Gene H. Bell-Villada (born 1941 in Haiti) is an American literary critic, novelist, translator and memoirist, with strong interests in Latin American Writing, Modernism, and Magic Realism.  His works include The Carlos Chadwick Mystery: A Novel of College Life and Political Terror, the short story collection The Pianist Who Liked Ayn Rand, and the critical studies Art for Art's Sake and the Literary Life, Borges And His Fiction: A Guide To His Mind And Art and Garcia Marquez: The Man And His Work.  He holds a doctorate from Harvard University and has been a professor at Williams College since 1975.

Bell-Villada was born in Haiti to a Hawaiian mother and a Euro-American father.  Besides Haiti he was raised in Puerto Rico, Venezuela and Cuba.  He wrote of this experience in Overseas American: Growing Up Gringo in the Tropics.

His literary criticism is notable for its harsh views of Vladimir Nabokov. Art for Art's Sake and Literary Life was so negative in its assessment that Publishers Weekly described it as a "bilious analysis" of the Russian-born American writer.  Bell-Villada explains the animosity by saying that he himself is a "lapsed disciple" of Nabokov.

List of works by Bell-Villada
Garcia Marquez: The Man and His Work (1990)
The Carlos Chadwick Mystery: A Novel of College Life and Political Terror (1990)
The Pianist Who Liked Ayn Rand: A Novella and 13 Stories (1998)
Art for Art's Sake (1998)
Borges and His Fiction: A Guide to His Art and Mind (2000) 
Overseas American: Growing Up Gringo in the Tropics (2005)
On Nabokov, Ayn Rand and the Libertarian Mind (2013)

ReferencesPublishers Weekly review of  Art for Art's Sake and Literary Life,'' April 22, 1996

External links 
 Author Page at Amador Books
 Williams College Bell-Villada page

1941 births
Living people
Haitian emigrants to the United States
American expatriates in Cuba
20th-century American memoirists
Harvard University alumni
Williams College faculty
20th-century American novelists
20th-century American male writers
American short story writers
American literary critics
Vladimir Nabokov
American translators
20th-century translators
American male novelists
American male dramatists and playwrights
American dramatists and playwrights
American male short story writers
Novelists from Massachusetts
American male non-fiction writers